Étienne Léandri (1915–1995) was an intermediary close to Charles Pasqua. He was part of the French Connection and Corsica Mafia organisation. He took part in the negotiations concerning many important international contracts, and represented, among others, the interests of Elf, Thomson CSF and Dumez.

Entrepreneur
Leandri commercialized "Gazogene", the burning of wood or charcoal to power automobiles, using a special apparatus. This method of powering autos had been developed at the turn of the 19th, 20th century but during the Second World War Leandri built a factory in Nice to retrofit automobiles formerly running on petrol and to produce new automobiles with the gazogene apparatus attached.

Businessman
During the war, he was a business associate of the American pharmaceutical and perfume manufacturer, E. Virgil Neal, of Tokalon; and, according to some accounts, Léandri had become Director of Tokalon by 1944.

Léandri was involved in various political scandals, such as the Sofremi affair, for which Pasqua has been indicted, and the affair concerning the moving of the headquarters of the GEC-Alsthom Transport firms (for which Pasqua has also been indicted). In 1994 the second affair concerning Alstom generated a commission of 5.2 million Francs (790,000 Euros) paid by Pasqua to Étienne Léandri.

Footnotes

See also 
Charles Pasqua
Service d'Action Civique

References 
 La Maison Pasqua, by Nicolas Beau. 2002.
 Les requins. Un réseau au cœur des affaires, by Julien Caumer, 1999.
 Conroy, M.S., The Cosmetics Baron You've Never Heard Of: E. Virgil Neal and Tokalon, Altus History LLC, (Englewood), 2009.  and fuller, revised 3rd Edition, 2014, .

1915 births
1995 deaths
20th-century French businesspeople
French people of Corsican descent